The 2022 Liberty Flames baseball team represented Liberty University during the 2022 NCAA Division I baseball season. The Flames played their home games at Liberty Baseball Stadium as members of the Atlantic Sun Conference They were led by sixth-year head coach Scott Jackson.

Game log 

Schedule Source:

Rankings

References 

2022 ASUN Conference baseball season
2022
2022 in sports in Virginia
Liberty